The following are the national records in track cycling in Guatemala maintained by its national cycling federation: Federación Guatemalteca de Ciclismo.

Men

Women

References

Guatemala
Records
Track cycling
Track cycling